Lazar Serebryakov, or by his birth name Ghazar Artsatagortsian, born in 1795 was a Russian Navy Admiral of Armenian descent. He participated in the Russo-Turkish War, 1828-1829, serving in the Black Sea and Baltic fleets, commanding battleships. In 1838, he laid the foundation of the city of Novorossiysk. He also held top command positions during the Crimean war (1853–1856). He died in 1862.

References 
 Famous Armenians on stamps

See also
 List of Armenians

1795 births
1862 deaths
Armenian people from the Russian Empire
Imperial Russian Navy admirals
Russian military personnel of the Crimean War